ARA Santa Cruz (S-41) is a member of the  of diesel-electric submarines of the Argentine Navy.

Design 

Santa Cruz was built by Thyssen Nordseewerke. It has a single-hull design, with a lightweight bow and stern and a watertight superstructure in the central part. Its sister vessel,  was the only other one of its type, though the program originally sought to produce a larger number of submarines.

Santa Cruz received its mid-life modernization at Arsenal de Marinha, Rio de Janeiro Brazil between September 1999 and 2001.  The work involved the replacement of the engines, batteries, and sonar.

History 

Santa Cruz was built by Thyssen Nordseewerke and completed on 18 October 1984.

On 15 June 2014, Santa Cruz ran aground in an accident near Buenos Aires. She was being towed to Tandanor shipyard for maintenance, and was unlocked without damage.

Mid-life extension 

In September 2016, Santa Cruz started a renovation and life extension program at the Tandanor shipyard in Buenos Aires, Argentina. The work was to  include changing all 960 batteries, periscope and snorkel maintenance, revision of engines, and overall system upgrades.

Renovation work was halted on 15 November 2017 when sister ship  imploded and subsequently sunk, to determine whether the cause of the incident was due to a failure that could be repeated on Santa Cruz. Work was restarted in February 2019, from where it was expected to take two years to return Santa Cruz back to service in 2021. However, by the end of 2020 the refit of Santa Cruz had been reported cancelled leaving the navy without an operational submarine.

See also 
 List of ships of the Argentine Navy

References

Notes

Bibliography

Further reading

External links
Santa Cruz class Patrol submarine
Submarino de ataque (SSK) classe Santa Cruz / TR-1700
Classe TR-1700
  Argentine Navy official website - Submarine Force page (Poder Naval - Fuerza de Submarinos - Unidades  (accessed 2017-02-04)
  Latin-American Submariners Community website (accessed 2017-02-04)

TR-1700-class submarines
1982 ships
Ships built in Emden